Todra is a census town in Sawai Madhopur district in the Indian state of Rajasthan.

Demographics
 India census, Todra had a population of 5245. Males constitute 51% of the population and females 49%. Todra has an average literacy rate of 58%, lower than the national average of 59.5%: male literacy is 72%, and female literacy is 43%. In Todra, 17% of the population is under 6 years of age.

References

Cities and towns in Sawai Madhopur district